Princess Izabela Maria Sanguszko (née Princess Izabela Maria Lubomirska), in Polish Izabela Maria z książąt Lubomirskich księżna Sanguszkowa (1 March 1808 – 18 March 1890) was a Polish noblewoman.

Princess Izabela Maria was born to Prince Henryk Ludwik Lubomirski (15 September 1777 – 20 October 1850) and Princess Teresa Czartoryska (30 July 1785 – 31 December 1868). Through her father she was great-granddaughter of Prince Stanisław Lubomirski and through her mother she was granddaughter of Prince Józef Klemens Czartoryski. She had two sisters: Dorota and Jadwiga Julia (she married Eugène, 8th Prince of Ligne) and brother Jerzy Henryk.

On 6 July 1829, in Przeworsk she married Prince Władysław Hieronim Sanguszko. They had five children:
 Jadwiga Klementyna Sanguszko (1830–1918) – she married Prince Adam Stanisław Sapieha
 Roman Damian Sanguszko (1832–1917) – he married Countess Karolina of Thun and Hohenstein, great-granddaughter of Count Alois Friedrich von Brühl
 Pawel Roman Sanguszko (1834–1876) – he married firstly Countess Marie Gfn von der Borch-Warkland and secondly Georgina Apponyi de Nagy-Appony
 Helena Sanguszko (1836–1891)
 Eustachy Stanisław Sanguszko (1842–1903) – he married Countess Konstancja Anna Zamoyska

She died in 1890.

Ancestry

References 

1808 births
1890 deaths
People from Przeworsk
People from the Kingdom of Galicia and Lodomeria
Izabela Maria Lubomirska